The 1968–69 Detroit Red Wings season was the franchise's 43rd season of competition, 37th season as the Red Wings.

Offseason

Regular season

Final standings

Record vs. opponents

Schedule and results

Playoffs

Player statistics

Regular season
Scoring

Goaltending

Note: GP = Games played; G = Goals; A = Assists; Pts = Points; +/- = Plus-minus PIM = Penalty minutes; PPG = Power-play goals; SHG = Short-handed goals; GWG = Game-winning goals;
      MIN = Minutes played; W = Wins; L = Losses; T = Ties; GA = Goals against; GAA = Goals-against average;  SO = Shutouts;

Awards and records

Transactions

Draft picks
Detroit's draft picks at the 1968 NHL Amateur Draft held at the Queen Elizabeth Hotel in Montreal, Quebec.

Farm teams

See also
1968–69 NHL season

References

External links

Detroit
Detroit
Detroit Red Wings seasons
Detroit Red Wings
Detroit Red Wings